International tourism is tourism that crosses national borders. Globalisation has made tourism a popular global leisure activity. The World Tourism Organization defines tourists as people "traveling to and staying in places outside their usual environment for not more than one consecutive year for leisure, business and other purposes". The World Health Organization (WHO) estimates that up to 500,000 people are in flight at any one time.

In 2010, international tourism reached US$919B, growing 6.5% over 2009, corresponding to an increase in real terms of 4.7%. In 2010, there were over 940 million international tourist arrivals worldwide. By 2016 that number had risen to 1,235 million, producing 1,220  billion USD in destination spending. The COVID-19 crisis had significant negative effects on international tourism significantly slowing the overall increasing trend.

International tourism has significant impacts on the environment, exacerbated in part by the problems created by air travel but also by other issues, including wealthy tourists bringing lifestyles that stress local infrastructure, water and trash systems among others.

History 
As a result of the late-2000s recession, international travel demand suffered a strong slowdown from the second half of 2008 through the end of 2009. This negative trend intensified during 2009, exacerbated in some countries due to the outbreak of the H1N1 influenza virus, resulting in a worldwide decline of 4.2% in 2009 to 880 million international tourists arrivals, and a 5.7% decline in international tourism receipts.

COVID-19

Rankings

Total volume of cross-border tourist travel 
International tourist arrivals reached 1.035 billion in 2012, up from over 996 million in 2011, and 952 million in 2010. In 2011 and 2012, international travel demand continued to recover from the losses resulting from the late-2000s recession, where tourism suffered a strong slowdown from the second half of 2008 through the end of 2009. After a 5% increase in the first half of 2008, growth in international tourist arrivals moved into negative territory in the second half of 2008, and ended up only 2% for the year, compared to a 7% increase in 2007. The negative trend intensified during 2009, exacerbated in some countries due to the outbreak of the H1N1 influenza virus, resulting in a worldwide decline of 4.2% in 2009 to 880 million international tourists arrivals, and a 5.7% decline in international tourism receipts.

World's top tourism destinations 

In 2019, there were 1.460 billion international tourist arrivals worldwide, with a growth of 3.7% as compared to 2018. The World Tourism Organization reports the following ten destinations as the most visited in terms of the number of international travelers in 2019.

International tourism receipts 
The World Tourism Organization reports that international tourism receipts were US$1.7 trillion in 2018, an increase in real terms of 4% over 2017. The top ten tourism earners in 2018 were:

International tourism expenditure 
The World Tourism Organization reports the following countries as the ten biggest spenders on international tourism for the year 2018.

Euromonitor International Top City Destinations Ranking 
Euromonitor International rated these the world's most visited cities by international tourists in 2017:

World Travel and Tourism Council

References 

Tourism
Economic globalization
Types of tourism